Bass-ment Cuts is a 1991 EP by the Inner City Posse.

Production

"Intro" contains samples of "Theme from The Dukes of Hazzard (Good Ol' Boys)". In it, the group mentions that the album contains many beats from other songs popular of the era. The song "Set It Off" contains a diss to N.W.A after the departure of Ice Cube, comparing them to Barry Manilow.

The entire album was recorded on a karaoke machine bought for Violent J by his then-girlfriend.

Release
Bass-ment Cuts was sold first hand by Inner City Posse, their friend Rudy Hill and his cousins, and Bruce's then-girlfriend Karen. Due to the success Rudy had selling the cassettes in Southwest side of Detroit, where the group had its most sales, Inner City Posse decided to call their label Rude Time Records. The group soon reached out to record store owner Alex Abbiss to sell their cassettes in his store Hot Hits. After the success of their sales on the street and with Alex, the group decided to pursue rapping as their professional career, teaming with Alex to create the record company Psychopathic Records.

In 2001, the album was re-released on CD at the Gathering of the Juggalos 2001, and is currently available for purchase on Psychopathic's official web-store, Hatchetgear.

Tracks
"Intro" - 1:02
"Set It Off" - 3:57
"Lock Down" - 1:06
"Bitches" - 4:24
"Insain Like" - 3:40
"Play That Hoe" - 3:45
"Ghetto Style" - 1:33
"The I.C.P." - 2:10

References

1990 EPs
Self-released albums
Insane Clown Posse EPs
Psychopathic Records EPs
Gangsta rap EPs